Hraungerðiskirkja is a Lutheran church in Flóahreppur, Iceland. 

The church was designed by Eiríkur Gíslason  from Bitra in Hraungerðishreppur 
and built in 1902. It stands on the site of another former church that dated back to 1200 CE. It is a wooden church with a red roof. On each side of the church are four windows, curved from the top with six-pane frames. Above the front door of the church are three windows. The church is clad in panel board  with the chancel wall and the truss clad in flat slabs. 

The church exterior was renovated, the tower rebuilt, concrete plastered, repairs to the frame and new windows installed   as well as protective doors in 1993-97 under the supervision of Hjörleif Stefánsson.

References

Other sources

External links
Hraungerðiskirkja on the Icelandic Church Map

Churches in Iceland
Churches completed in 1902
20th-century churches